The National Council of Trade Unions (NACTU) is a national trade union center in South Africa.

History
The federation was formed by the merger of the Council of Unions of South Africa (CUSA) and the Azanian Confederation of Trade Unions (AZACTU) in 1986.  In its early years, the federation was strongly influenced by the black consciousness movement, but was divided in its attitude to the African National Congress.

In 1994, the federation affiliated to the International Confederation of Free Trade Unions (ICFTU), the first post-apartheid South African union to do so, and it remains affiliated to its successor, the International Trade Union Confederation.  In 2006, the federation began negotiating a merger with the rival Federation of Unions of South Africa.  They formed an umbrella organisation, the South African Confederation of Trade Unions, in 2007, but it achieved little, and the two federations remained independent.

In 2001, the newly founded Association of Mineworkers and Construction Union (AMCU) affiliated to NACTU, soon becoming its largest member.  AMCU argued that unions should remain independent of political parties, which caused tensions in 2014, when NACTU endorsed the Economic Freedom Fighters and the Pan Africanist Congress of Azania.  AMCU resigned in 2017, but the federation's total membership figure of 400,000 has not been updated.  Much of its membership is low paid, and it is particularly strong in KwaZulu-Natal, Gauteng, Limpopo and Mpumalanga.

Affiliates

Current affiliates
The NACTU has 20 affiliated unions.

Former affiliates

General Secretaries
1986: Phiroshaw Camay
1989: Cunningham Ngcukana
2004: Mahlomola Skosana
2000s: Manene Samela
2010s: Narius Moloto

See also 

 Trade unions in South Africa

References

External links
 

 
International Trade Union Confederation
National trade union centres of South Africa
 
Trade unions in South Africa
Trade unions established in 1986